Aaron Paquette is a Canadian writer, artist, speaker and politician who currently serves on the Edmonton City Council, representing Ward Dene in the city's northeast. He was first elected to the Edmonton City Council on October 16, 2017.

He was a winner of the Burt Award for First Nations, Métis and Inuit Literature in 2015 for his debut young adult fantasy novel Lightfinder (Kegedonce Press). As a painter, his most notable work is a public art mural at Edmonton's Government Centre station (formerly Grandin station.) He also created several iconic images used in the Idle No More movement. His work may also be found in the Canadian Museum for Human Rights. His murals are also present the walls of many Edmonton schools and public locations.

He is featured in the documentary program, "From the Spirit."

Paquette is Métis of Cree (Nehiyaw), Cayuse and Norwegian descent.

Consulting work 
Paquette is the president of Cree8 Success, a consulting firm.

In 2012, Cree8 Success ran an Education Conference that hosted the following facilitators and presenters: David Bouchard, Richard Wagamese, Ryan McMahon, ASANI (musical trio made up of Debbie Houle, Sarah Pocklington, and Sherryl Sewepagaham), K.A.S.P. (a.k.a. Paul Sawan),Dawn Marie Marchand, Amanda Woodward (traditional dancer), and Richard Van Camp, in addition to Aaron Paquette.

Paquette has recorded a podcast for Cree8 Success, which can be accessed through SoundCloud.

Politics

He ran as a New Democratic Party candidate in the riding of Edmonton Manning in the 2015 federal election, defeated by candidate Ziad Aboultaif of the Conservative Party.

In 2017, Paquette ran for Edmonton City Council in Ward 4, which includes the neighbourhoods of Northeast Edmonton, Manning, and Clareview. Paquette defeated 11 other candidates for the seat with 23.79% of the vote.

Paquette announced in March 2021 that he will seek re-election to the Edmonton City Council in October 2021. He emphasized that as a City Councilor he has focused on improving services for Edmonton residents and ending what are known as "ward wars," wherein municipalities fight with each other for budgets and support services. The 2021 municipal election saw changes to the ward names and boundaries, and Paquette was re-elected in Ward Dene, which includes his former Ward 4. He was among just a handful of councillors in the election to receive the majority of the vote in the ward involved - Paquette received 54 percent of the vote in his ward.

Electoral record

References

21st-century Canadian painters
21st-century Canadian novelists
Canadian male novelists
Canadian muralists
New Democratic Party candidates for the Canadian House of Commons
Alberta candidates for Member of Parliament
Métis writers
Métis painters
Métis politicians
Living people
Canadian fantasy writers
Canadian writers of young adult literature
Canadian people of Norwegian descent
Artists from Edmonton
Edmonton city councillors
Writers from Edmonton
21st-century Canadian male writers
21st-century First Nations writers
First Nations novelists
1974 births
Canadian male painters